"Bubalu" is a song by Puerto Rican producers DJ Luian and Mambo Kingz, featuring Puerto Rican rapper Anuel AA and American singers Prince Royce and Becky G. It was released as a single on November 6, 2018.

Charts

Certifications

References

2018 singles
2018 songs
Anuel AA songs
Prince Royce songs
Becky G songs
Spanish-language songs
Songs written by Prince Royce
Songs written by Anuel AA
Songs written by Becky G